Jean-Eugène Buland (26 October 1852 in Paris – 18 March 1926 in Charly-sur-Marne) was a French painter.

Biography 
The son of an engraver, Buland entered the École nationale supérieure des Beaux-Arts under the tutelage of Alexandre Cabanel. His earliest works were Symbolist paintings of antique scenes, but he quickly turned towards depicting scenes of everyday life.

He used photographs in order to paint with realism. He received the Second Grand Prix de Rome two years in a row, in 1878 and 1879. His participation in the Salon led to several awards: an honorable mention in 1879, a third-place medal in 1884, followed by a second-place medal in 1887. At the World's Fair in Paris in 1889 he was honoured with a silver medal. He was inducted into the Legion of Honour in 1894.

He profited from the commissions he received from major institutions such as the Musée du Luxembourg, and other museums in the provinces. He painted several panels of the Salon of Sciences at the Hôtel de Ville, Paris and decorated the ceiling of the city hall at Château-Thierry.

The Museum of Fine Arts of Carcassonne, which held his work Mariage Innocent (Innocent Marriage), devoted a retrospective to him from October 19, 2007, to January 19, 2008, publishing a catalogue for the occasion.

He was the brother of Jean-Émile Buland (1857–1938), an engraver and winner of the 1880 Prix de Rome.

Works 

Offrande à la Vierge (Offering to the Virgin), 1879
Offrande à Dieu (Offering to God), 1880
L'annonciation (The Annunciation), 1881
Les Fiancés (The Fiancés), 1881
Jésus chez Marthe et Marie (Jesus at the home of Martha and Mary), 1882
 Mariage innocent (Innocent Marriage), 1884 Musée des Beaux-Arts de Carcassonne
La Visite lendemain de noces (The Visit Following the Wedding), 1884
L'annonciation (The Annunciation), 1885
The Restitution à la Vierge (The Restitution to the Virgin), 1885
C'est Celui-là (It's That One), 1886
Les Héritiers (The Heirs), 1887, Bordeaux Museum
Un Patron (The Lesson of the Apprentice), 1888, Nationalmuseum, Stockholm
Propagande (Propaganda), 1889, Musée d'Orsay
'Auguste au tombeau d'Alexandre (Augustus at the Tomb of Alexander), Musée d'Orsay
Déjeuner Des Laveuses (Lunch of the Washerwomen), 1900
Conseil municipal et commission de Pierrelaye organisant la fête (Municipal and Commission Advice of Pierrelaye organizing the celebration), 1891, Hôtel de ville de Pierrelaye Val-d'Oise
Un jour d'audience (A Day of Audience), 1895, Chi Mei Museum, Tainan, Taiwan
Bretons en prière (Bretons in prayer), 1889, Museum of Fine Arts, Quimper
Le Tripot (The Casino), 1883, Museum of Fine Arts, Quimper
Flagrant délit (Flagrant Crime), 1893, Museum of Fine Arts, Quimper
Bonheur des parents (Parent's Happiness), 1903

Selected paintings

Sources
Cathy Pays, Eugène Buland 1852-1926 : Aux limites du réalisme, Éditions PanamaMusées, October 2007
Legion of Honour File of Jean-Eugène Buland

External links

1852 births
1926 deaths
Painters from Paris
19th-century French painters
French male painters
20th-century French painters
20th-century French male artists
École des Beaux-Arts alumni
19th-century French male artists